The 2011 Stanford Cardinal football team represented Stanford University in the 2011 NCAA Division I FBS college football season. The Cardinal were led by former offensive coordinator and new head coach David Shaw, as Jim Harbaugh departed following the 2010 season in order to become the head coach of the San Francisco 49ers. They played their home games at Stanford Stadium and are members of the North Division of the Pac-12 Conference. They finished the season with 11–2 in overall record, 8–1 in Pac-12  play to finish in a tie with Oregon for first place in the North Division. Due to their head-to-head loss to Oregon, they did not represent the division in the inaugural Pac-12 Football Championship Game. They were invited the Fiesta Bowl, their second consecutive BCS game, where they were defeated by Oklahoma State 38–41 in overtime.

Roster

Coaching staff
David Shaw – head coach
Derek Mason – Associate head coach/co-defensive coordinator/defensive backs
Pep Hamilton – Offensive coordinator/quarterbacks
Jason Tarver – Co-defensive coordinator/Inside linebackers
Randy Hart – Defensive line
Mike Bloomgren – Running game coordinator/offensive line
Mike Sanford Jr. – Running backs
Lance Anderson – Outside linebackers
Brian Polian – Recruiting coordinator/special teams/safeties
Ron crook – Tight ends/offensive tackles
Shannon turley – Head strength coach
Nick holz – Offensive assistant
Aaron moorehead – Offensive assistant
Morgan turner – Offensive assistant
Chester McGlockton – Defensive Assistant
Tavita Pritchard – Defensive Assistant
Jordan sundheim – Graduate Assistant

Schedule

Game summaries

San Jose State

    
    
    
    
    
    
    
    
    
    
    

Known as the "Bill Walsh Legacy Game" (Bill Walsh was a graduate of San Jose State and a two-time head coach at Stanford), this game marked the 65th meeting between Stanford and San Jose State—the most times Stanford has faced a single non-Pac-12 opponent.  Entering the game with a record-high #7 preseason ranking (this ties the 1950 team's #7 preseason ranking, the team's highest-ever ranking), the Cardinal achieved their 50th win in the series as 2011 Heisman Trophy runner-up Andrew Luck threw two touchdown passes and ran for a third. In all, six Stanford players scored touchdowns, with running back Stepfan Taylor scoring twice on short rushes.

at Duke

    
    
    
    
    
    
    
    
    

The Cardinal held a 10–0 lead late in the first half due to an Andrew Luck touchdown pass to Coby Fleener and a 40-yard Jordan Williamson field goal. Duke made a game of it after safety Lee Butler returned a deflected pass 76 yards for a touchdown and the Blue Devils recovered an onside kick on the next play. But Stanford held Duke to a single series, and following a short punt, scored another touchdown before halftime. The second half was all Stanford, as Luck threw two more touchdowns, Jonathan Stewart ran for a 30-yard score, and Tyler Gaffney added a one-yard plunge to rout the Blue Devils.

at Arizona

Stepfan Taylor rushed for a career-high 153 yards and Andrew Luck threw for 325 yards as the Cardinal held the Wildcats scoreless in the second half to win 37–10. Arizona quarterback Nick Foles completed his first 17 passes for 198 yards and a touchdown, but after that, he was 7 for 16 and 41 yards as the Cardinal began to break down the passing attack. The victory was costly for the Cardinal, however, as junior linebacker and leading tackler Shayne Skov suffered a season-ending knee injury in the second quarter.

UCLA

Coming into the game, Stanford trailed UCLA 45–33–3 in a series that dates back to 1925 and both teams had the same 19–19–2 record for games played at Stanford. Stanford's Coby Fleener scored on 18 and 51-yard receptions and Stepfan Taylor added two rushing touchdowns as the Cardinal downed UCLA 45–19. UCLA tight end Joseph Fauria caught two of the Bruin touchdown passes.

Colorado

Andrew Luck threw for 370 yards—the second-most in his college career—and three touchdowns as the Cardinal routed Colorado, 48–7 and improved to 5–0 on the season, Stanford's best start since the 1951 season. Stanford linebacker Max Bergen blocked a Colorado field goal attempt in the first quarter and ran back the ball 75 yards for Stanford's first score. Fullback Ryan Hewitt caught two of Luck's touchdown passes with Griff Whalen catching the other. Three different running backs scored for the Cardinal on one-yard rushes.

at Washington State

Andrew Luck threw an interception on his first pass of the game, but recovered to throw four second-half passes—two to tight end Levine Toilolo—as the Cardinal routed the Cougars, 44–14. At the end of the first half, Washington State had closed to within 10–7 on a two-yard run from Carl Winston, but that would end their scoring until a short touchdown dive with 14 seconds left in the game. On the ensuing kickoff of that final Cougar touchdown, Stanford's Ty Montgomery returned the kick 96 yards as time expired to give the Cardinal a 30-point win. Stanford won its 14th consecutive game, setting a school record (breaking the marks set in 1904–1905 and 1939–1940–1941) and extending the nation's longest current winning streak. The team won by its ninth consecutive 25+ point victory margin, the longest such streak in the BCS era since Boise State in 2002.

Washington

Stanford set a single-game school rushing record of 446 yards (breaking the previous record of 439 set against Oregon State in 1981, led by Darrin Nelson's 190 yards) as the Cardinal overpowered the visiting Huskies 65–21. Stepfan Taylor ran for 138 yards and a touchdown, Tyler Gaffney had 117 yards and a touchdown, and Anthony Wilkerson had 93 yards and two touchdowns. The Cardinal extended its streak of 15 consecutive wins (longest in school history, and longest current streak in the nation), as well as 10 consecutive wins by more than 25 points (longest streak in college football since the poll era began in 1936). Washington's Chris Polk had two long touchdown runs to highlight Washington's scoring.

at USC

    
    
    
    
    
    
    
    
    
    
    
    
    
    
    
    
    

The Cardinal outlasted the Trojans in a triple overtime thriller, winning 56–48, and remaining unbeaten and in the hunt for the 2012 BCS National Championship Game. The Cardinal led 10–6 at halftime, but on the first series of the second half, USC running back Curtis MacNeal broke free for a 61-yard touchdown run to put the Cardinal behind in a game for the first time all season. MacNeal added another score on USC's next series to put Stanford further in the hole. But Stanford quarterback Andrew Luck led the Cardinal right back, firing a 5-yard touchdown pass to Ryan Hewitt and adding a 2-yard rush of his own to put the Cardinal back up by 3 at the end of three quarters. In the fourth quarter, Trojans quarterback Matt Barkley put USC ahead on a 28-yard touchdown pass to Marqise Lee, which was followed by a Stanford field goal to tie the game at 27 apiece.

With about 5 minutes remaining, Stanford began what they hoped would be a game-winning last drive, but Luck's pass was intercepted by Nickell Robey and returned for a USC score to put the Trojans on top. But the Cardinal recovered, and on the ensuing drive, Luck led the Cardinal for a tying Stepfan Taylor touchdown rush with 38 seconds left to send the game to overtime. After both teams scored in the first two overtime periods, the Cardinal had the ball first in the third overtime, scoring on a Taylor 5-yard run and converting on the mandatory 2-point conversion. On the first play of USC's possession, Barkley completed a 21-yard pass to Lee to put the Trojans on the 4-yard line. On the next play, Barkley handed off to MacNeal. Stanford defensive tackle Terrence Stephens reached up from the ground and stripped the ball, which rolled into the end zone where Stanford linebacker A.J. Tarpley pounced on it to end the game and secure a Stanford victory.

at Oregon State

Stanford rushed for 300 yards behind strong performances from all its backs, led by Stepfan Taylor's 95 yards, to hold off the Beavers, 38–13. Andrew Luck threw for 206 yards and 3 touchdowns, while Oregon State's Sean Mannion threw for 252 yards and one touchdown. Luck moved within 6 passing touchdowns of both the Stanford single-season mark of 32 (set by Luck in 2010) and of the Stanford career touchdown mark of 77 held by John Elway.

Oregon

    
    
    

    
    
    
    
    
    
    
    
    
    

Oregon's LaMichael James rushed for 146 yards and 3 touchdowns as the #6 Ducks defeated the #3 Cardinal 53–30. After falling behind early in the first half, the Cardinal closed to within a touchdown on an Andrew Luck touchdown pass to Griff Whalen shortly before halftime. The Ducks blew the game open in the second half, with two short touchdowns by James and a Boseko Lokombo interception of a Luck pass returned 40 yards for a touchdown. Stanford did not lose at home again until the second game of the 2014 season, when it lost 13-10 to visiting USC, ending the longest home winning streak in the nation at 17.

California

    
    
    
    
    
    
    
    
    
    

In a rain-soaked game, the Cardinal held on to defeat the Bears 31–28. The Cardinal scored on the third play from scrimmage on a reverse to Ty Montgomery, who ran 34 yards for the score. The Bears added two Giorgio Tavecchio field goals and a 17-yard touchdown pass from Zack Maynard to Keenan Allen to move in front 13–7, before a Tyler Gaffney run gave Stanford back the lead in the middle of the third quarter. Touchdown passes to Levine Toilolo and Ryan Hewitt in the third quarter extended the lead. The Bears scored two fourth-quarter touchdowns to move within 3 points with seconds to play, but Stanford recovered the onside kick to retain possession of the Axe for another year.

Notre Dame

    
    
    
    
    
    

Powered by four Andrew Luck touchdown passes, the Cardinal defeated the Fighting Irish in Luck's final home game at Stanford 28–14. With the first score, Luck tied John Elway's Stanford career touchdown total, and surpassed it. The Stanford defense held Notre Dame scoreless until midway through the third quarter, forcing a fumble and recording two interceptions. The Cardinal won its third in a row against Notre Dame, extending its longest winning streak in the rivalry that dates to 1925.

Fiesta Bowl vs. Oklahoma State

    
    
    
    
    
    
    
    
    
    
    
    
    

In a back-and-forth thriller, the Cardinal fell to the Cowboys in overtime, 41–38, after kicker Jordan Williamson missed two late field goals, one at the end of regulation and one in overtime. Stanford rolled up 590 yards of total offense, including 347 passing yards and two touchdown passes from Andrew Luck and 177 rushing yards and two touchdowns from Stepfan Taylor, but Oklahoma State kept them close, forcing four ties but never taking the lead until the game's final play. Cowboys' quarterback Brandon Weeden and receiver Justin Blackmon connected for three touchdown passes, but ultimately, the game was decided by special teams, with Oklahoma State kicker Quinn Sharp connecting on a 22-yard field goal in overtime shortly after Williamson missed his attempt from 43 yards.

Rankings

Statistics

Scores by quarter (all opponents)

Scores by quarter (Pac-12 opponents)

References

Stanford
Stanford Cardinal football seasons
Stanford Cardinal football